Sublett may refer to:
A variant of Sublette (surname)
Sublett, Kentucky, a settlement in Kentucky, USA
 Sublett Range,  a mountain range in the U.S. states of Idaho (~94%) and Utah (~6%)